The Civis Media Prize for Integration honors people for  radio and television broadcasting projects that promote peaceful coexistence within the European immigration community.

Promoting understanding between peoples of different cultures and religious beliefs, revealing the complex causes of violence and demonstrating the successful mastering of conflict across national borders, can only succeed if the media report to the public about these complex topics realistically and informatively. Fighting racism and discrimination is not exclusively a national task.

The Civis media prize is awarded as a European television prize and as a German-language radio prize in EU and Switzerland. With the Young Civis media prize there is a sponsorship prize for young journalists as well as students and graduates of the film and media colleges, who are no older than 32 years of age. The CIVIS Online Media Prize will recognize journalistically-designed websites on the theme of integration and cultural diversity. The Civis prize is endowed with a total of 46,000 Euros. The entry is open to all programme contributions which satisfy the conditions of participation. It is presented on May every year and the prize-giving ceremony will be broadcast on radio and television.

Organisation 
The CIVIS Media Prize for integration and cultural diversity in Europe is organised annually in the European Union and Switzerland, by the CIVIS Media Foundation on behalf of the Association of Public Broadcasting Corporations in the Federal Republic of Germany (ARD), represented by Westdeutscher Rundfunk (WDR), together with the Freudenberg Foundation. Cooperation partners of the European prize are: Second German Television Channel (ZDF), Westdeutscher Rundfunk (WDR), Bavaria Film und Fernsehen GmbH, Deutsche Welle (DW), Deutschlandfunk (DLF), the German current affairs and documentary channel PHOENIX, Österreichischer Rundfunk (ORF), Association Relative à la Télévision Européenne (ARTE), the European Broadcasting Union (EBU), SRG SSR idée suisse, German Savings Banks Association (DSGV), 3sat, the European Parliament, the German Federal Government Commissioner for Migration, Refugees and Integration, European Union Agency for Fundamental Rights (FRA), RTV Slovenia (Radio Televizija Slovenija) and WDR mediagroup GmbH.

The organisation and conduct of the Civis media prize is handled by the non-profit-making Civis media foundation for integration and cultural diversity in Europe.

The object of the company is to sensitize radio and television to the theme of integration and cultural diversity and to promote innovative and professional handling of developments in the European immigrant community. The foundation aims to make a contribution to intercultural understanding and to European integration through the work of the media.

Board of Trustees
of the CIVIS Media Foundation
The Board of Trustees assumes an important representative function for the organisation. The Board of Trustees acts in the civil society in order to effectively present the interests of the organisation to the public. The members of the Board of Trustees have a right to nominate programme contributions which are worthy of prizes in the European media prize. 
Chairwoman is Monika Piel, Director-General of Westdeutscher Rundfunk (WDR)

Advisory board of the CIVIS Media Foundation
The Advisory Board consists of twelve persons, who are professionally involved in the media field and hold responsible positions there. Exceptions are possible. The task of the Advisory Board is to examine the projects of the foundation and to make recommendations to the Executive Director and the Partners’ Meeting. The members of the Advisory Board work on an honorary basis. 
Chairwoman is Jona Teichmann, Head of Programme Department for Regional Radio Programmes (WDR)
Partner's meeting
of the CIVIS Media Foundation
Partners of the CIVIS Media Foundation are Westdeutscher Rundfunk (WDR), on behalf of the ARD, and the Freudenberg foundation. The partners’ meeting sets the annual financial framework for the organization and decides on the programme and projects of the CIVIS Media Foundation. Chairwoman is Eva-Maria Michel, Legal advisor and Deputy Director-General of Westdeutscher Rundfunk (WDR)

History
The Civis Media Award was established in 1988 by the Federal Commissioner for Immigration Issues and ARD. It had the motto "Living in Cultural Diversity – Against Racism and Discrimination" until 2002.

Since 2003, the prize has organised by the Media Foundation for Integration and Cultural Diversity in Europe. Since 2004, the foundation has organised a Young Civis Media Prize, for young journalists, students and graduates from film and media colleges.

The prize has been awarded every year since 1988.

References

External links
Civis website

Peace awards
Broadcasting awards
German awards
Awards established in 1988